Robert Pierre may refer to:

 Robert Pierre (musician) (born 1992), Christian musician from Orlando, Florida
 Robert E. Pierre (born 1968), reporter and editor at The Washington Post
 Rob S. Pierre, a fictional character from the Honorverse fiction series

See also
 Pierre Robert (disambiguation)